Gopalganj is a district (zilla in Bengali) in the Dhaka Division of Bangladesh. The district has about 1,172,415 civilians and its surface area is 1,490 km2. The main city of the district is also called Gopalganj. It stands on the bank of the Madhumati river and located at 23°00’47.67" N 89°49’21.41". It is bounded by Faridpur district on the North, Pirojpur and Bagerhat district on the south, Madaripur & Barisal district on the East and Narail district on the West.

Gopalganj is subdivided into five sub-districts (upazila/thana).

The Office of the Deputy Commissioner, Gopalganj has developed a web portal of the district as www.gopalganj.gov.bd under the 'Access to Information' program of the Prime Minister's Office. This has been done under the Digital Bangladesh implementation concept of the incumbent government.

History
In 1800, Preetiram Das of Janbazar, Kolkata purchased Makimpur Porgona (in present days under the area of Gopalganj) costing 19 thousand taka and became the landlord of the Porgona. Babu Rajachandra Das, the 2nd son of Preetiram Das was married to Rani Rasmoni of Mahishya clan on 4 April 1804. Landlord Rajachandra died only at 49 leaving his widowed wife Rani Rasmoni and three daughters on 9 June 1836. Padmamoni, the eldest daughter of Rani Rasmoni, married Ramchandra and gave birth to seven children; Mahendranath, Ganeshchandra, and five others. Mahendranath, eldest son of Padmamoni and Ramchandra died at a premature age and Ganeshchandra (second son) became landlord of the estate. To show respect to Rani Rasmoni, the tenants of Khatra estate changed the name of Rajganj Bajar to Gopalganj (Gopal from Nabo Gopal and Ganj from Ranjganj) following the name of Nabo Gopal, son of Ganeshchandra and great grandson of Rani Rasmoni.

This area was under the southern part of ancient Bengal called Vanga. Around 300 BC here in Kotalipara was the capital of Gangaridai dynasty. Gangaridai was one of the powerful kingdom of Indian subcontinent. It was described by the Greek traveller Megasthenes in his work Indica. During Sultanate and Mughal period several Hindu kings ruled the area. In 1713, Muksudpur Upazila was part of Jessore district while the rest of Gopalganj was part of Dhaka - Jalalpur District. Muksedpur was later transferred to Faridpur district in 1807. Gopalgaj Gopalganj Sadar and Kotalipara was part of Jalalpur Porgona of Faridpur district. Chandana (now Modhumoti) river was the borderline for Jessore and Dhaka - Jalalpur districts in 1812. Gopalgnaj - Madaripur was a large water body back then where maritime robbery was a regular activity. Thus, Madaripur Mohakuma or Sub-division was separated in 1854 from Bakergonj District.

Later, Gopalganj emerged as a police station in 1872 under the Madaripur Mohakuma or Sub-division vide Calcutta Gazette of 1870. In 1873, Madaripur Mohakuma or Sub-division was transferred to Faridpur district from Bakergonj district. Later in 1909, it was separated from the Madaripur Mohakuma of Bakergonj district to form a new Gopalganj Mohhakuma or sub-division. Later, Muksudpur Police Station of Faridpur district joined Gopalganj and Kotalipara police stations of Gopalganj Mohakuma or sub-division of Faridpur district.

The first SDO (sub-divisional officer) was Mr. Suresh Chandra Sen. In 1910, the sub-divisional officer's bench court was transformed into Criminal Court. In 1921, Gopalganj was elevated to township status which was inhabited by only 3,478 persons. 1925 saw the initiation of Civil Court. In 1936, Muksudpur was split to form Kashiani police station.

Gopalganj Mohakuma or sub-division emerged as Gopalganj district on the 1st day of February in 1984. Mr. AFM Ehiya Chowdhury was the first District Commissioner of Gopalganj District.

In the same year, Tungipara was separated from the Sadar Upazila to form a new upazila namely Tungipara upazila. After the liberation war in 1972, Gopalganj Sadar became Municipality or Pourashava and Panna Biswas was selected as its first chairman.

Politics

Gopalganj is associated with significant importance in Bangladesh politics. The district is the political bastion of the Awami League. Bangabandhu Sheikh Mujibur Rahman, the Father of the Nation and the first President of Bangladesh, hailed from the village of Tungipara in the district and began his political career in the said district. Her Excellency Sheikh Hasina Wajed, the current Prime Minister of Bangladesh also hails from the same district. Sheikh Fazlul Haq Mani, his nephew, had also been elected to Parliament from Gopalganj-2 constituency. Unfortunately both Rahman and his nephew were assassinated on 15 August 1975.

Rahman's daughter, has been elected 4 times as the Member of the Parliament (MP) from Gopalganj-3 (Kotalipara and Tungipara) constituency and thrice as the Prime Minister of Bangladesh. Her cousin and Sheikh Mani's brother, Sheikh Fazlul Karim Selim has been elected 4 times as the MP from Gopalganj-2 constituency. Lt. Col. Mohammad Faruq Khan, also a presidium member of Bangladesh Awami League, is from Gopalganj-1 constituency.

Molla Jalal, Choudhury Emdadul Hoq, Khan Saheb, Sheikh Mosharrof Hossain and Advocate Khandaker Mahbub Uddin, Sheikh Shahadat Hossain, a boyhood friend of Bangabandhu and an educationalist were among other popular political leaders of this area.

Geography
 Rivers: Garai, Modhumoti, Kaliganga, Madaripur Beel route channel, Hunda, Ghagore,Old Kumar rivers and Barashia River etc.
 Large Water Bodies/Beel/Haor/Baor: Borni Baor, Chandar beel and Baghyar beel.

Climate

Demographics

According to the 2011 Bangladesh census, Gopalganj District had a population of 1,172,415, of which 577,868 were males and 594,547 were females. Rural population was 1,043,710 (89.02%) while urban population was 128,705 (10.98%). Gopalganj had a literacy rate of 58.09% for the population 7 years and above: 60.30% for males and 55.98% for females.

Today the majority are the Bengali Muslims, although before Partition Hindus, most of whom were Namasudras, formed a clear majority in what is today Gopalganj district. The largest minority group is the Bengali Hindus, while Christians are present in good numbers. The Muslim population has constantly increased, while due to land grabbing and persecution Hindu population has constantly decreased from a high of nearly 400,000 (40% of the population in 1981) to 350,000 today, and the Christian population has remained constant at 13,000. Gopalganj has the highest percentage of Hindus of any district in Bangladesh. The district of Gopalganj has 356 mosques, 359 temples, and 250 churches.

Administration
Gopalganj district consists of 5 upazilas (previously known as 'Thana or police station' which is essentially a sub-district) namely Gopalganj Sadar, Kotalipara, Kashiani, Muksudpur, and Tungipara; 4 Pourashavas/ Municipalities namely Gopalganj (Class A), Tungipara (Class B), Kotalipara (Class B) & Muksudpur (Class C) and 68 unions.

The main township is known as Gopalganj Sadar, which consists of 9 wards and 49 mahallas. Gopalganj municipality was constituted in 1972. It has an area of 8.59 km2 and a population of 40,987; male 53.27%, female 46.73% with a population density of 4,771 per km2.

Administrator of Zila Porishod: Md. Atiar Rahman

Deputy Commissioner (DC): Kazi Mahbubul Alam

Subdivisions
 Gopalganj Sadar Upazila
 Kashiani Upazila
 Kotalipara Upazila
 Muksudpur Upazila
 Tungipara Upazila

Transport
Gopalganj has a great transportation system. It is a 5 hours drive away from the capital Dhaka by road subject to traffic conditions. The journey time is set to reduce once the Padma Multipurpose Bridge is opened for all. Dhaka-Khulna Highway goes through Gopalganj to connect the neighbouring districts namely Barisal, Narail, Faridpur, Madaripur, Bagerhat and Khulna. Buses leaves Dhaka for Gopalganj from both Gabtoli and Syedabad. Tungipara Express, Modhumoti, Dola, Bonoful leaves from Sayedabad for Gopalganj via Munshiganj - Mawa - Kawrakandi - Madaripur and Comfort Line, Sheba Green, Polash leaves from Gabtoli for Gopalganj via Manikgonj - Paturia - Doulotdia - Rajbari - Faridpur.

Water transportation was the main medium of transport for the people of this district in the 1980s but the popularity of it has declined over time with the introduction of road connectivity. Now a launch operates between Sadarghat of Dhaka and Poisharhat of Kotalipara. However, mechanical trawlers and boats still ply through the rivers, canals and vast water bodies.

An inoperable rail line is in place till Kashiani. The train service is also set to be reintroduced after the Padma Bridge is built.

On 14 April 1986, at least 92 people were killed in Gopalganj by the heaviest hailstones ever recorded, which were the size of grapefruits and weighed around 1 kg (2.2 lb) each.

Education
The district has 21 colleges, 181 high schools and 760 primary schools. Other notable educational institutions are as follows:
Bangabandhu Sheikh Mujibur Rahman Science and Technology University
Arpara Islamia High School
Binapani Govt. Girls High School
Bhatiapara High School (1961)
Bangabandhu Poverty Reduction Training Complex
Gaohardanga Madrasa (historical Madrasa in southern Bangladesh)
Govt. Bangabandhu College
Gopinathpur High School (1911)
Gopalgonj Model Polytechnic Institute
Gimadanga Ideal High School
Hazi Laal Mia City College
Sheikh Fazilatunnesa Govt. Mohila College
S.M. Model Govt. High School
S.K. Aliya Madrasah
Sheikh Russel Destitute Children Training and Rehabilitation Center at Tungipara
Sheikh Hasina Girls School and College
Swarnakali High School
Sabira - Rouf College
Moulovi Abdul Hye Memorial School & College
Paikkandi Panchapalli Madrasah
Ulpur PC High School (1900)

Notable people
 Shamsul Haque Faridpuri, Islamic scholar
 A. Q. M. Jainul Abedin, journalist
 Abdullah Baqui, public health scientist
 Sukanta Bhattacharya, Bengali poet
 Habibur Rahman, police officer
 Sheikh Hasina, Prime Minister of Bangladesh
 Sheikh Mujibur Rahman, father of the nation
 Shariff Enamul Kabir, academic
 Kazi Anowar Hossain, painter
 Sarbari Roy Choudhury, Indian sculptor
 Sayera Khatun, mother of Mujibur Rahman
 Sheikh Lutfar Rahman, civil servant and father of Mujibur Rahman
 Wahiduzzaman, politician
 R. C. Majumdar, Indian Historian and 4th VC of DU
 Jamil Uddin Ahmed, Bangladeshi army general
 Harichand Thakur, Founder of Matua sect
 Guruchand Thakur, Social reformer

Notes

References

External links
 Districts of Bangladesh
 Gopalganj district
 Detailed Maps of Gopalganj

 
Districts of Bangladesh